Accidentally on Purpose is an American sitcom television series created by Claudia Lonow, that ran on CBS from September 21, 2009, to April 21, 2010, during the 2009–10 season. The series stars Jenna Elfman, Jon Foster, Ashley Jensen, Nicolas Wright, Grant Show, and Lennon Parham and was produced by BermanBraun and CBS Television Studios. It was based on the book of the same name by Mary F. Pols.

On May 18, 2010, CBS cancelled the series after one season.

Plot
Accidentally on Purpose follows Billie (Jenna Elfman), a San Francisco movie critic in her 30s. Billie meets Zack (Jon Foster), an aspiring chef in his 20s, at a local bar and they have a one-night stand. She soon finds out that she is pregnant, and decides to keep the baby. She must simultaneously deal with her boss and ex-boyfriend, James (Grant Show), who finds himself jealous of Zack. Before the story began, she had hoped that James would ask her to marry him, but he told her that he was not ready because he was married once before.

Thanks to this unexpected arrival, Billie and Zack have agreed to live together platonically, since the only place that Zack has called home is his van. While Billie receives encouragement and advice from her alcoholic best friend Olivia (Ashley Jensen) and her conventional, younger, married sister Abby (Lennon Parham), she also has to deal with Zack's freeloading friend Davis (Nicolas Wright), among others, when they start turning her place into a frat house, leaving Billie to question whether she is living with a boyfriend, a roommate, or a second child to raise.

Theme song
The theme song for the show is "Birds of a Feather", written by David Fagin of the indie-rock band The Rosenbergs. The song is on their album Department Store Girl.

History
On November 3, 2009, CBS ordered an additional five episodes of the series, bringing the total to 18. In early 2010 CBS moved Accidentally on Purpose to Wednesday nights from Mondays, to accommodate the midseason return of Rules of Engagement and the cancellation of Gary Unmarried. However, after the ratings slipped CBS elected not to renew the series and on May 18, 2010, made the cancellation official; the cancellation was part of CBS' decision to eliminate all of its Wednesday night comedies in favor of trying a Thursday-night block.

Critical reception
Accidentally on Purpose received mixed reviews, scoring a 50/100 on Metacritic, while scoring a 6.2/10 with viewers. The New York Times, in a review of the show's first episode, called Grant Show's performance "graceful" and said Elfman is as "funny as the script allows, in that broad, robo-comic way you may remember from Dharma & Greg."

The series had an average of eight million viewers per episode while airing on Mondays after How I Met Your Mother, but fell to an average of 5.5 million of viewers per episode while airing on Wednesdays after The New Adventures of Old Christine, which was also canceled in 2010.

Cast
Jenna Elfman as Billie Chase
Jon Foster as Zack Crawchuck
Ashley Jensen as Olivia Hollenbeck
Nicolas Wright as Davis
Grant Show as James
Lennon Parham as Abby Chase
Pooch Hall as Ryan
David Sutcliffe as Brian
Larry Wilmore as Dr. Roland
Bryan Cuprill as Nick
Michael Rapaport as Sullivan "Sully" Boyd
Matthew Glave as Officer Marion Ravitz

Crew
Claudia Lonow – Writer
Lloyd Braun – Executive Producer
Gail Berman – Executive Producer
Jack Rudy – Music Supervisor

Episodes

References

External links

Mary F. Pols' website

2009 American television series debuts
2010 American television series endings
2000s American romantic comedy television series
2010s American romantic comedy television series
2000s American sitcoms
2010s American sitcoms
CBS original programming
English-language television shows
Pregnancy-themed television shows
Television shows based on books
Television series by CBS Studios
Television shows set in San Francisco